Dave Hill (born May 15, 1984) is an American television writer. He is known for writing four episodes of the HBO series Game of Thrones: in season 5, "Sons of the Harpy"; in season 6, "Home"; in season 7, "Eastwatch"; and in season 8, "Winterfell".

Hill began working as an assistant to Game of Thrones executive producers/writers David Benioff and D.B. Weiss in season 2. In 2014, Hill became a staff writer for the fifth season and was assigned to write an episode. He was credited as story editor on Season 6 and executive story editor on Season 7, and wrote an episode for each. In "Winterfell", he appeared in a cameo as an Ironborn soldier killed by Theon Greyjoy.

He is also well known for his performance in the critically acclaimed in Mexico, Anyone Home.

Television

References

External links

Living people
American television writers
American male television writers
1984 births